The Canton of Montmélian is a canton located within the Savoie department of France.

Elected to represent the canton in the General Council of Savoie'': 
 Jean-François Duc and Jacqueline Tallin (2015-2021)

Composition
Since the French canton reorganisation which came into effect in March 2015, the communes of the canton of Montmélian are:

 Apremont
 Arbin
 Arvillard
 Bourget-en-Huile
 La Chapelle-Blanche
 La Chavanne
 Chignin
 La Croix-de-la-Rochette
 Détrier
 Laissaud
 Les Mollettes
 Montmélian
 Myans
 Planaise
 Le Pontet
 Porte-de-Savoie
 Presle
 Rotherens
 Sainte-Hélène-du-Lac
 Saint-Pierre-de-Soucy
 La Table
 La Trinité
 Valgelon-La Rochette
 Le Verneil
 Villard-Sallet
 Villard-d'Héry
 Villaroux

See also
 Arrondissement of Chambéry
 Cantons of the Savoie department
 Communes of the Savoie department

References

External links
 Maison Forte de la Candia

Montmelian